Apt. is an abbreviation for apartment.  

Apt may also refer to:

Places 
 Apt Cathedral, a former cathedral, and national monument of France, in the town of Apt in Provence
 Apt, Vaucluse, a commune of the Vaucluse département of France
 Arrondissement of Apt, an arrondissement in the Vaucluse département of France
 Canton of Apt, France
 Opatów, a town in Poland, called "Apt" in the Yiddish language

Surname 
 Jerome Apt (born 1949), Ph.D., an American astronaut
 Leonard Apt, inventor of the Apt test
 Milburn G. Apt (1924–1956), US test pilot

Arts, entertainment, and media
 Apt. (album), a 2006 album by Chilean singer Nicole
 Apt. (film), a 2006 South Korean horror film
 Apt, a literary journal published by Aforementioned Productions
 Apt Pupil, a novella by Stephen King, originally published in the 1982
 Apt Pupil (film), a 1998 film based on Stephen King's eponymous novel
 Apt Records, a subsidiary record label of ABC-Paramount Records

Other uses
 APT (software), a package manager associated with Linux, commonly spelled "apt", in lowercase
 Apt (Egyptian), may refer to several deities or to a location in Egypt
 Apt (Martian crater)
 Apt test, a medical test used to differentiate fetal or neonatal blood from maternal blood
 Apt meteorite of 1803, a meteorite which fell in Provence-Alpes-Côte d'Azur, France

See also 
 APT (disambiguation)
 Apartment (disambiguation)